Synnöve Solbakken is a 1957 Swedish drama film directed by Gunnar Hellström and starring Synnøve Strigen, Harriet Andersson and Edvin Adolphson. It was shot at the Centrumateljéerna Studios in Stockholm and on location around Gudbrandsdalen in Norway. The film's sets and costumes were designed by the art director Harald Garmland. It is based on the 1857 novel of the same title novel of the same title by Norwegian writer Bjørnstjerne Bjørnson.

Cast
 Synnøve Strigen as 	Synnöve Solbakken 
 Harriet Andersson as Ingrid Granliden
 Edvin Adolphson as 	Sämund Granliden
 Gunnar Hellström as 	Aslak
 Bengt Brunskog as Thorbjörn Granliden
 Ove Tjernberg as 	Knut Nordhaug
 Olga Appellöf as 	Ingeborg Granliden
 Birgitta Valberg as 	Karen Solbakken
 Kolbjörn Knudsen as 	Knut's Father
 Oscar Ljung as Guttorm Solbakken
 Gunnar Sjöberg as Doctor
 Malou Fredén as 	Young Synnöve
 Leif Nilsson as 	Young Torbjörn
 Kenneth Synnerud as 	Young Knut
 Börje Bergquist as 	Knut's Partner 
 Kurt Emke as 	Farm Hand at Nordhaug 
 Olle Hilding as Priest 
 Stig Johanson as 	Guest at the Wedding 
 Birger Lensander as 	Guest at the Wedding 
 John Melin as 	Bellringer 
 Stina Ståhle as 	Knut's Mother
 Mona Åstrand as Knut's Sister

References

Bibliography 
 Qvist, Per Olov & von Bagh, Peter. Guide to the Cinema of Sweden and Finland. Greenwood Publishing Group, 2000.
 Wright, Rochelle. The Visible Wall: Jews and Other Ethnic Outsiders in Swedish Film. SIU Press, 1998.

External links 
 

1957 films
1957 drama films
1950s Swedish-language films
Films directed by Gunnar Hellström
Films set in Norway
Films based on Norwegian novels
Remakes of Swedish films
Swedish historical drama films
1950s historical drama films
Films set in the 19th century
1950s Swedish films